Moschendorf Castle is a levelled mediaeval hill castle at a height of  about 50 metres east of the village of Moschendorf, in the market municipality of Gößweinstein in the Franconian county of Forchheim in the south German state of Bavaria.

The castle was mentioned in the records in 1464 when the lords of Rabenstein and lords of Groß were named as occupants. The castle was destroyed in 1525 during the Peasants' War.

Of the former castle only a few wall remnants and a neck ditch remain.

Literature 
 
 Hellmut Kunstmann: Die Burgen der östlichen Fränkischen Schweiz. Aus der Reihe: Veröffentlichungen der Gesellschaft für Fränkische Geschichte Reihe IX: Darstellungen aus der Fränkischen Geschichte, Vol. 20. Kommissionsverlag Degener und Co., Neustadt/Aisch, 1965, pp. 179–183.

External links 
 

Castles in Bavaria
Hill castles
Forchheim (district)
Gößweinstein